Swamp tea tree is a common name for several plants and may refer to:

Melaleuca dealbata
Melaleuca irbyana
Pericalymma ellipticum, endemic to Western Australia